TC Energy Corporation (formerly TransCanada Corporation) is a major North American energy company, based in the TC Energy Tower building in Calgary, Alberta, Canada, that develops and operates energy infrastructure in Canada, the United States, and Mexico. The company operates three core businesses: Natural Gas Pipelines, Liquids Pipelines and Energy.

The Natural Gas Pipeline network includes  of gas pipeline, which transports more than 25% of North American natural gas demand. The Liquids Pipelines division includes  of oil pipeline, which ships 590,000 barrels of crude oil per day, which is about 20% of Western Canadian exports. The Energy division owns or has interests in 11 power generation facilities with combined capacity of 6,600 megawatts (MW). These power sources include nuclear and natural gas fired. The company is expanding its energy division to include more renewable sources including pumped storage, wind, and solar generation.

The company was founded in 1951 in Calgary. The company's US headquarters is located in the TC Energy Center skyscraper in Houston, Texas. 

TC Energy is the largest shareholder in, and owns the general partner of, TC PipeLines.

History

The company was incorporated in 1951 by a Special Act of Parliament as Trans-Canada Pipe Lines Limited. The purpose of the company was to develop the TransCanada pipeline (now known as the Canadian Mainline) to supply eastern Canadian markets with natural gas produced in the west.

In 1998, TransCanada Pipelines merged with NOVA Corporation's pipeline business, keeping the TransCanada name and becoming "the fourth largest energy services company in North America".

Seeking to expand its presence in the United States, in 2016, TransCanada acquired Columbia Pipeline Group (CPG) for US$13 billion from NiSource's Shareholders. The CPG acquisition added a pipeline network in Pennsylvania and surrounding states, where the Marcellus and Utica shale gas formations are located.

In May 2019, the company changed its name from TransCanada Corporation to TC Energy Corporation to better reflect the company's business, which includes pipelines, power generation and energy storage operations in Canada, the United States and Mexico.

In October 2019, the iconic 56-story Bank of America Center skyscraper in Houston, Texas was renamed as TC Energy Center and serves as the company's US headquarters.

Operations

Natural gas pipelines
TC Energy's natural gas pipelines business builds, owns and operates a network of natural gas pipelines across North America that connects gas production to interconnects and end use markets. The company transports over 25% of continental daily natural gas demand through 91,900 km (57,100 mi) of pipelines. In addition, the company owns 535 Bcf of natural gas storage facilities, making TC Energy one of the largest natural gas storage providers in North America. This segment is TC Energy's largest segment, generating approximately two-thirds of the company's EBITDA in 2017. The Natural Gas Pipelines business is split into three operating segments: Canadian Natural Gas Pipelines, U.S. Natural Gas Pipelines, and Mexico Natural Gas Pipelines.

The major pipeline systems include:

NGTL System (24,320 km) A wholly owned subsidiary, NOVA Gas Transmission Ltd., connects gas producers in the Western Canadian Sedimentary Basin with consumers and exports. TC Energy has the largest and most extensive natural gas network in Alberta.
Canadian Mainline (14,077 km) this pipeline serves as a long haul delivery system transporting natural gas from the Western Canadian Sedimentary Basin across Canada to Ontario and Québec to deliver gas to downstream Canadian and U.S. markets. The pipeline has evolved accommodate additional supply connections closer to its markets. The mainline is over 60 years old
Columbia Gas (18,113 km) This natural gas transportation system serves the Appalachian Basin, which contains the Marcellus and Utica plays, two of the largest natural gas shale plays in North America. The system also interconnects with other pipelines that provide access to the U.S. Northeast and the Gulf of Mexico. ANR Pipeline System (15,109 km) This pipeline system connects supply basins and markets throughout the U.S. Midwest, and south to the Gulf of Mexico. This includes connecting supply in Texas, Oklahoma, the Appalachian Basin and the Gulf of Mexico to markets in Wisconsin, Michigan, Illinois and Ohio. In addition, ANR has bi-directional capability on its Southeast Mainline and delivers gas produced from the Appalachian basin to customers throughout the Gulf Coast Region.Columbia Gulf (5,377 km) — This pipeline system was originally designed as a long haul delivery system transporting supply from the Gulf of Mexico to major demand markets in the U.S. Northeast. The pipeline is now transitioning to a north-to-south flow and expanding to accommodate new supply in the Appalachian Basin and its interconnects with Columbia Gas and other pipelines to deliver gas to various Gulf Coast markets.Mexico Pipeline Network (1,680 km) — This consists of a growing network of natural gas pipelines in Mexico.

Projects in development include:Coastal GasLink Pipeline Project — In June 2012 it was announced that TransCanada was selected by Shell and LNG Canada partners Korea Gas Corporation, Mitsubishi Corporation and PetroChina Company Limited (to which Petronas of Malaysia was added in 2018) to design, build, own and operate the Coastal GasLink pipeline between northeastern B.C. gas fields near Dawson Creek, British Columbia, and the LNG Canada LNG liquefaction, storage and export facility in the port of Kitimat, on the Douglas Channel.
The investment and construction decisions for the LNG Canada and Coastal GasLink Pipeline Project were officially confirmed early October 2018, for completion by 2024–2025. However, hereditary chiefs of the Wetʼsuwetʼen have denied consent to construct the pipeline on the company's preferred route through culturally and ecologically sensitive lands in their unceded territory, leading to nationwide protests.Prince Rupert Gas Transmission project — In January 2013 it was announced that TransCanada was selected by Petronas to design, build, own, and operate the Prince Rupert Gas Transmission project, a gas pipeline that would transport natural gas from the Montney region near Fort St. John, British Columbia to a LNG terminal planned by Progress Energy Canada Ltd. in Port Edward, British Columbia on Lelu Island near Prince Rupert, British Columbia. The project faced opposition from the Gitxsan first nation due to concerns about the impact it would have on salmon in the Skeena River. On July 25, 2017, Petronas announced they were abandoning the Pacific NorthWest LNG proposal and TransCanada said they were "reviewing our options related to our proposed Prince Rupert Gas Transmission (PRGT) project".

Liquids pipelines
Two TC Energy's Liquids pipelines connect Alberta crude oil supplies to U.S. refining markets., the Keystone Pipeline System and the Grand Rapids pipelines. The 460 km-Grand Rapids pipeline transports crude oil from the producing area northwest of Fort McMurray, Alberta, to the Edmonton/Heartland, Alberta market region. In October 2012, TransCanada formed a 50–50 CAD$3bn joint-venture with Phoenix Energy Holdings Ltd. (the Canadian subsidiary of PetroChina) to develop the 500 km Grand Rapids Pipeline.

The 4,324 km-Keystone Pipeline System transports crude oil from Hardisty, Alberta, to U.S. markets at Wood River and Patoka, Illinois, Cushing, Oklahoma, and the U.S. Gulf Coast. The Keystone System transports approximately 20% of Western Canadian crude oil to export markets. The Keystone Pipeline has had three significant leaks since it opened in 2010. It has leaked approximately 400 barrels in North Dakota in 2011 and South Dakota in 2016, and approximately 5000 barrels in South Dakota in 2017.

A third pipeline, the 1,906 km-long Keystone XL Pipeline — which is an expansion of the Keystone Pipeline System — began construction in 2020. When completed, the Keystone XL Pipeline will transport 830,000 barrels of Athabasca oil sands crude oil per day from the Hardisty, Alberta to Steele City, Nebraska.

TC Energy had first proposed the Keystone XL pipeline in 2008. The proposal faced widespread grassroots opposition with tactics including tree sits in the path of the pipeline and civil disobedience by celebrities. Critics state that by developing the oil sands, fossil fuels will be readily available and the trend toward warming of the atmosphere won't be curbed. The fate of the pipeline is therefore held up as symbolic of America's energy future. Critics have raised concerns about the risks of spillage, as the Sandhills region of Nebraska is a fragile ecosystem.

In October 2011, TransCanada was involved in up to 56 separate eminent domain actions against landowners in Texas and South Dakota who refused to give permission to the company to build the Keystone Pipeline through their land. However, on August 23, 2012, Texas Judge Bill Harris ruled that TransCanada had the right of eminent domain and could lease or purchase land from owners who refused to sign an agreement with the company for a public right of way for the pipeline. The landowners had said that the pipeline was not open to other companies, and so did not meet the criteria for eminent domain.

U.S. President Barack Obama rejected the pipeline on November 3, 2015.

Early in his tenure in 2017, President Donald Trump signed presidential memoranda to revive both Keystone XL and Dakota Access pipelines. The order would expedite the environmental review that Trump described as an "incredibly cumbersome, long, horrible permitting process".

In 2017, Trump signed a U.S. Presidential Permit to allow TransCanada to build the Nebraska pipeline route of the Keystone XL. TransCanada secured sufficient commercial support to commence construction preparation.

This action by Trump inspired another wave of protests and rallies against the pipeline.

In March 2020, Premier Jason Kenney of Alberta, agreed to help finance the construction of TC Energy's Keystone XL oil sands pipeline in southern Alberta, Montana, South Dakota and Nebraska with a CA$7.5 billion (US$5.3 billion) financing agreement. According to The New York Times , despite the coronavirus pandemic, a down turn in the global economy, and "plunging oil prices", Premier Kenney said that Alberta could not afford "for Keystone XL to be delayed." With this financial agreement, the Alberta government gained a US$1.1-billion ownership stake in the 1,947-kilometre pipeline which will "575,000 barrels of oil daily".  The province intends to sell its shares to TC Energy "after commercial operations begin." Alberta also gave a full guarantee on a US$4.2-billion project loan. The $USD1.1 billion equity covers construction costs from April through December 2020. TC Energy will also invest CA$.7 billion. The Alberta government are also providing a fully guaranteed CA$4.2 billion loan for the project. The premier also said that over the next twenty years, the financial benefits to Alberta through tax and royalty revenue would be approximately CA$30 billion. In response to Alberta's financial support, in March, TC Energy "approved construction of the US$8-billion project to transport up to 830,000 barrels per day of oil." According to a Canadian Press March 31, 2020 article Premier Kenney estimated that "1,400 direct and 5,400 indirect jobs" would be created in Alberta during construction. In September 2020, TC Energy announced that it would be restructuring some of its gas pipeline operations in Alberta.

In April, shortly after construction on Keystone XL began, Judge Brian M. Morris of the Federal District Court in Montana suspended the United States Army Corps of Engineers (USACE)'s program allowing permits for pipelines to cross waterways, in spite of the Clean Water Act (CWA). Judge Morris said that the USACE pipeline permits "posed a threat to endangered species" and its reauthorization in 2017, had been improper. In July 2020, the Supreme Court of the United States declined to block Judge Morris' ruling, effectively halting all construction on the XL Pipeline.

In September 2020, the Nekaneet Cree Nation in Saskatchewan, the Ermineskin Cree Nation, Montana First Nation, Louis Bull Tribe, and Saddle Lake Cree Nation in Alberta signed a memoranda of understanding (MOU) for an ownership stake in Keystone XL.

In a Canadian Press article Calgary energy reporter, Dan Healing, wrote that Keystone XL's future was "still in doubt"—if Presidential candidate Joe Biden wins the November 3, 2020 United States presidential election, he would fulfill his promise to cancel the pipeline's "vital presidential permit."

In January 2021, U.S. President Joe Biden revoked the project’s presidential permit.

Marshall County, South Dakota leak 2017

On November 16, 2017, oil leaked from the pipeline in Marshall County, South Dakota, for 15 minutes before the flow of oil could be stopped. The company reported the amount as over 210,000 gallons. TransCanada reported it discovered the leak in Amherst, South Dakota, at 6 am on Thursday after systems detected a drop in pressure in the northern leg of the pipeline. The leak was discovered about 35 miles south of the Ludden pump station.

In April 2018, a federal investigation showed that the spill was almost twice as large as TransCanada had claimed in November, and that it was the seventh-largest onshore oil spill since 2002. The study showed that 407,000 gallons, not 210,000 gallons, had spilled. Also in April 2018, Reuters reviewed documents that showed that Keystone had "leaked substantially more oil, and more often, in the United States than the company indicated to regulators in risk assessments before operations began in 2010".

Energy

TC Energy's Energy division consists of power generation and unregulated natural gas storage assets. The power business consists of approximately 7,000 megawatts (MW) of generation capacity owned or under development. These assets are located primarily in Canada and are powered by natural gas, nuclear, and wind.Western Power These assets include approximately 1,000 MW of power generation capacity through four natural gas-fired cogeneration facilities in Alberta and one in Arizona.Eastern Power These assets include approximately 2,900 MW of power generation capacity in Eastern Canada.Bruce Power''' This operates the Bruce Nuclear Generating Station in Ontario. Comprising eight nuclear units with a combined capacity of approximately 6,400 MW, it is currently the largest operating nuclear power plant in the world. TC Energy holds a 48.4% interest in the asset.
TC Energy has proposed two pumped storage projects and one solar project to store and supply clean energy. The Ontario Pumped Storage Project near Meaford, Ontario would provide 1000 MW of clean energy and the proposed Canyon Creek Pumped Storage Project near Hinton, Alberta would provide 75 MW of clean energy. The proposed Saddlebrook Solar + Storage project in Aldersyde, Alberta would consist of 102.5 MW of solar generation with utility-scale energy storage.

Ownership
As of February 2020, the bulk of the share capital of TC Energy is owned by 488 institutional investors, who compose 62% of the stock. The dominant shareholder is the Royal Bank of Canada, which owns a fraction over 8% of the company. The Big Five (banks) together own more than 17% of the outstanding share capital. Significant holdings accrue to the Caisse de dépôt et placement du Québec and the OMERS.

Operational projects

Operational natural gas pipelines

Operational liquids pipelines

Operational power projects

Political activities
In 2019 TransCanada aided the drafting of anti-protest legislation in South Dakota. The legislation, which Governor Kristi Noem signed into law in March 2019, created a fund to cover the costs of policing pipeline protests, and was accompanied by another law which sought to raise revenue for the fund by creating civil penalties for advising, directing, or encouraging persons participating in rioting. In response to the law Noem was sued by the Indigenous Environmental Network, Sierra Club, and other groups, who argued the laws violate First Amendment rights by incentivizing the state to sue protesters.

Leadership

Chairman of the Board
N. Eldon Tanner, 1957–1958
Charles S. Coates, 1958–1961
James W. Kerr, 1961–1979
John M. Beddome, 1979–1983
Gordon P. Osler, 1983–1989
J. V. Raymond Cyr, 1989–1991
Gerald J. Maier, 1991–1998
Richard F. Haskayne, 1998–2005
S. Barry Jackson, 2005–2016
Siim A. Vanaselja, 2016–

President
Clinton W. Murchison, 1951–1954
N. Eldon Tanner, 1954–1957
Charles S. Coates, 1957–1958
James W. Kerr, 1958–1968
Vernon L. Horte, 1968–1972
George W. Woods, 1972–1979
Radcliffe R. Latimer, 1979–1985
Gerald J. Maier, 1985–1993
George W. Watson, 1993–1999
Douglas D. Baldwin, 1999–2001
Harold N. Kvisle, 2001–2010
Russell K. Girling, 2010–2021
François L. Poirier, 2021–

References

External links

Keystone XL Pipeline website

 
Crude oil pipelines companies
Energy companies of Canada
Natural gas companies of Canada
Natural gas pipeline companies
Electric power companies of Canada
Companies based in Calgary
Holding companies of Canada
Energy companies established in 1951
Non-renewable resource companies established in 1951
1951 establishments in Alberta
Companies listed on the Toronto Stock Exchange
S&P/TSX 60